Dunsterville is a surname. Notable people with the surname include:

 Edward Dunsterville (1796–1873), British naval officer and hydrographer
 Hugh Dunsterville
 G. C. K. Dunsterville (1905–1988), British business executive and orchidologist
 Lionel Dunsterville (1865–1946), British general